Eastern Group Headquarters, is an under-construction, 38-storey skyscraper office building located in Linkou District, New Taipei, Taiwan. The ground breaking ceremony of the building was held on 13 April 2022. It will become the second tallest building in New Taipei and the 13th tallest in Taiwan upon its estimated completion in 2025. Upon completion, the building will serve as the new headquarters for the Eastern Group. The project hopes to develop the surrounding area into the "Cannes" of Asia by building multifunctional performance and exhibition centers, hotels, enterprise headquarters and commercial facilities on the site. The Eastern Group will introduce new technologies to the park, including artificial intelligence and the Internet of Things, to create a "circle of life" dominated by the audiovisual and music sectors.

See also 
 List of tallest buildings in Taiwan
 List of tallest buildings in New Taipei

References

Skyscraper office buildings in New Taipei
Buildings and structures under construction in Taiwan